This is a list of breweries in Ireland. Brewing has a long history in Ireland; the country's largest city, Dublin, is home to one of the largest breweries in the world, St James's Gate Brewery, founded by Arthur Guinness more than 250 years ago.

With Irish people being the world's sixth biggest drinkers of beer, there has been plenty of opportunity for new breweries to gain a share of the market, and a wide range of craft beers began appearing in the early years of the current century, produced at microbreweries and in brewpubs across the country.

Operational breweries 

As of mid-2018, in addition to international/macro-breweries such as Guinness and Heineken, there were 75 independent craft breweries in operation in the Republic of Ireland, with around 35 in operation in Northern Ireland. They include:

Notes on mergers and defunct breweries 

Achill Island Brewery, Achill Island, Bunacurry, Mayo, 2014-2017 
Beamish and Crawford (Heineken), Cork, 1792–2009 : relocated to Murphy's Brewery
Boyne Brewhouse, Drogheda, 2016–2019, some brands bought by O'Haras and resumed
Carrig Brewery, Drumshanbo, active from 2011–2019, merged with Brú Brewery in 2019 and the brewing operation moved to the latter's brewery in 2019. In late 2021, Brú Brewery and Galway Bay Brewery merged, but announced that brewing would continue in both breweries.
Lett's Brewery, Enniscorthy, 1864–1956. Still licensed and firm still exists but brewery inoperative.
Macardle Moore Brewery (Diageo), Dundalk - 1850-2000
Smithwick's (Diageo), Kilkenny, 1710–2013 : relocated to St. James's Gate

See also

Beer in Ireland
Beer in Northern Ireland

References

External links
Irish Brewers Association
Independent Craft Brewers of Ireland

Beer in Ireland
Lists of breweries by country